The Tokunoshima language ( Shimaguchi or  Shimayumiita), also Toku-No-Shima, is a dialect cluster spoken on Tokunoshima, Kagoshima Prefecture of southwestern Japan. It is part of the Amami–Okinawan languages, which are part of the Japonic languages.

Dialects
Okamura (2007) posits two divisions of Tokunoshima: Kametsu–Amagi in the north and Isen in the south. Kametsu is the traditional politico-cultural center of the island. It has been a center of distributions of new lexical traits, some of which were not confined in Tokunoshima Town but spread to Amagi Town in the northeast and, less frequently, to Isen. The dialects of Isen are considered more conservative by the speakers.

Folk terminology
According to Okamura Takahiro (b. 1936 in Asama, Amagi Town), the speakers of Tokunoshima call their tongues sïmagucï, which consists of two morphemes. The first part sïma (Standard Japanese shima) refers to an island both in Standard Japanese and Tokunoshima but it also means (one's own) local community in Tokunoshima and other Amami dialects. The second part kucï (Standard Japanese kuchi) means a mouth, and by extension, speech. Hence, sïmagucï refers to the speech of one's own community and of the island as a whole. Note that sïmagucï is more strongly associated with the former because the speakers of Tokunoshima are fully aware that each shima has a distinct language.

Phonology
The following is the phonology of the Kametsu dialect, which is based on Hirayama et al. (1986).

Consonants
As with most Ryukyuan languages to the north of Central Okinawan, stops are described as "plain" C’ and "glottalized" C‘. Phonetically, the two series are lightly aspirated  and tenuis , respectively.

Notes
The zero onset /'/ may be added.
 is new and infrequent.

Vowels

Correspondences to Standard Japanese
Only major sound correspondences are listed.
Standard Japanese  is merged into .
The fusion of two consecutive morae resulted in glottalized consonants in Tokunoshima.

References

Sources
Tokunoshima hōgen jiten (2014) by Okamura Takahiro, Sawaki Motoei, Nakajima Yumi, Fukushima Chitsuko and Kikuchi Satoru. Based on Okamura's Asama dialect.

External links
Literature on the Tokunoshima dialect by Fukushima Chitsuko (in Japanese)

Kagoshima Prefecture
Ryukyuan languages